The European Conference on Object-Oriented Programming (ECOOP), is an annual conference covering topics on object-oriented programming systems, languages and applications. Like other conferences, ECOOP offers various tracks and many simultaneous sessions, and thus has different meaning to different people.

The first ECOOP was held in Paris, France in 1987. It operates under the auspices of the Association Internationale pour les Technologies Objets, a non-profit organization located in Germany.

ECOOP’s venue changes every year, and the categories of its program vary. Historically ECOOP has combined the presentation of academic papers with comparatively practical experience reports, panels, workshops and tutorials.

ECOOP helped object-oriented programming develop in Europe into what is now mainstream programming, and helped incubate a number of related disciplines, including design patterns, refactoring, aspect-oriented programming,  and agile software development.

The winners of the annual AITO Dahl-Nygaard Prize are offered the opportunity to give a keynote presentation at ECOOP.

The sister conference of ECOOP in North America is OOPSLA.

See also
 List of computer science conferences
 List of computer science conference acronyms
 List of publications in computer science
 Outline of computer science

External links
 

Computer science conferences
Programming languages conferences
Dahl–Nygaard Prize